This is a list of lighthouses in Sierra Leone.

Lighthouses

See also
List of lighthouses in Guinea (to the north)
List of lighthouses in Liberia (to the south)
 Lists of lighthouses and lightvessels

References

External links

Sierra Leone
Lighthouses
Lighthouses